Anup Das (born 18 May 1964) is an Indian former cricketer. He played twelve first-class matches for Bengal between 1985 and 2003.

See also
 List of Bengal cricketers

References

External links
 

1964 births
Living people
Indian cricketers
Bengal cricketers
Cricketers from Kolkata